The squash competitions at the 2017 Southeast Asian Games in Kuala Lumpur took place at National Squash Centre.

Medal table

Medalists

References

External links
 

Squash at the Southeast Asian Games
2017 Southeast Asian Games events
2017 in squash